PASS-PORT is a web-based electronic portfolio assessment and course management system operated by Innovative Learning Assessment Technologies, LLC.

History

Origins
PASS-PORT was originally conceived as a way to help the 20 teacher preparation schools prepare for, and pass, the revised NCATE 2000 unit standards.  This new standard set was highly data-driven and required that accredited bodies keep detailed information student performances and evaluations of those performances that were to be used to improve academic programs and services over time.  The Louisiana Board of Regents for Higher Education funded a statewide project to develop an electronic data system to assist with the collection and aggregation of student learning performance data and work on the system began in late 1999.  PASS-PORT entered service in 2001 and was made available to all of the Louisiana schools at no cost.

Public use
From 2001 to 2006, all of the Louisiana teacher preparation schools who chose to use PASS-PORT had an NCATE review and all passed.  During this time, the system continued to be refined and expanded.

Hurricane Katrina
In late August 2005, Hurricane Katrina made landfall in southeast Louisiana.  The storm's enormousness had 2 effects on PASS-PORT:
 Teacher preparation students from University of New Orleans, Southern University at New Orleans, Tulane University, and Dillard University were all able to retrieve all of their pre-existing course work that had been loaded into the PASS-PORT servers (safely located in Baton Rouge, LA) so that they could complete their academic programs at other institutions without having to produce duplicate work.
 The Louisiana legislature became uninterested in on-going funding of the public project.

Commercialization
Beginning in late 2005, Innovative Learning Assessment Technologies negotiated with the two Louisiana schools who jointly owned the PASS-PORT intellectual property: University of Louisiana at Lafayette and Xavier University of Louisiana.  An agreement was reached that provided ILAT with an exclusive on-going license to the PASS-PORT system while allowing the Louisiana schools to maintain ownership (for longevity purposes).

Today
Today, ILAT continues to offer PASS-PORT to schools, both in and out of Louisiana, on a fee basis.  With the introduction of new editions of the PASS-PORT system that target additional accrediting bodies beyond teacher preparation, there is renewed interest in the software's unique capabilities and history.

Purpose
PASS-PORT is designed to help colleges and universities meet accreditation standards for their academic programs and student services.  It assists administrators in collecting, aggregating, and reporting performance-based assessment data—aligned to accreditation standards—from a number of sources:
File Artifacts submitted by students for review by a faculty member
Professional Development Experiences
Field Experiences with associated assessments from faculty members and participating teacher mentors
Web Links to student works
Student Self Assessments in the form of questionnaires
Faculty Assessments of student performance
Standardized Tests such as the Praxis battery
Course Grades
It has a template-based design which allows administrators to design their own evaluation instruments and associate those measurements directly to standards.  PASS-PORT also collects Demographic data on students, faculty members, and field experience participants.  It also automates the review process associated with a student's transition points (which PASS-PORT calls a portal).

PASS-PORT has several editions that are suitable for use in a variety of contexts:
 PASS-PORT HE (Higher Education Edition) - for Teacher Education schools pursuing NCATE or TEAC accreditation
 PASS-PORT BE (Business Edition) - for business schools pursuing AACSB or ACBSP accreditation
 PASS-PORT NE (Nursing Edition) - for nursing schools pursuing NLNAC or CCNE accreditation and other health care related programs
 PASS-PORT CE (Campus Edition) - for schools pursuing regional accreditation and other programs not covered by other editions

See also
 Learning management system

External links
 PASS-PORT Information Site
 Innovative Learning Assessment Technologies, LLC

Educational software